The 2015 Malaysian Open, Kuala Lumpur was a men's professional tennis tournament played on hard courts. It was the seventh edition of the tournament, and part of the 2015 ATP World Tour. It took place in Kuala Lumpur, Malaysia between 28 September and 4 October 2015.

Singles main-draw entrants

Seeds

 Rankings are as of 21 September 2015

Other entrants 
The following players received wild cards into the singles main draw:
  Nicolás Almagro
  Ivo Karlović
  Ramkumar Ramanathan

The following player received entry using a protected ranking into the singles main draw:
  Radek Štěpánek

The following players received entry from the singles qualifying draw:
  Michał Przysiężny
  Yūichi Sugita
  Yasutaka Uchiyama
  Mischa Zverev

Withdrawals 
Before the tournament
  Pablo Carreño Busta → replaced by  Benjamin Becker
  Pablo Cuevas  → replaced by  Alexander Zverev
  Teymuraz Gabashvili → replaced by  Nikoloz Basilashvili
  Richard Gasquet → replaced by  Tatsuma Ito
  Steve Johnson → replaced by  Santiago Giraldo
  Benoît Paire → replaced by  Radu Albot
  Fernando Verdasco → replaced by  Aleksandr Nedovyesov

Retirements
 Santiago Giraldo (Illness)
 Aleksandr Nedovyesov (Back Injury)

Doubles main-draw entrants

Seeds

 Rankings are as of 21 September 2015

Other entrants 
The following pairs received wildcards into the doubles main draw:
  James Frawley /  Nick Kyrgios
  Mohd Assri Merzuki /  Syed Mohd Agil Syed Naguib

Champions

Singles

 David Ferrer defeated  Feliciano López, 7–5, 7–5

Doubles

  Treat Huey /  Henri Kontinen defeated  Raven Klaasen /  Rajeev Ram, 7–6(7–4), 6–2

External links
 Official website

2015 ATP World Tour
September 2015 sports events in Asia
October 2015 sports events in Asia
Open
2015